The Communauté d'agglomération of Hénin-Carvin is the communauté d'agglomération, an intercommunal structure, centred on the cities of Hénin-Beaumont and Carvin. It is located in the Pas-de-Calais department, in the Hauts-de-France region, northern France. It was created on 1 January 2001. Its seat is Hénin-Beaumont. Its area is 112.1 km2. Its population was 126,509 in 2018, of which 25,917 in Hénin-Beaumont.

Composition
The communauté d'agglomération consists of the following 14 communes:

Bois-Bernard
Carvin
Courcelles-lès-Lens
Courrières
Dourges
Drocourt
Évin-Malmaison
Hénin-Beaumont
Leforest
Libercourt
Montigny-en-Gohelle
Noyelles-Godault
Oignies
Rouvroy

References

External links
Official Website

Henin-Carvin
Henin-Carvin
Hauts-de-France region articles needing translation from French Wikipedia